The 2008 Oklahoma Democratic presidential primary, part of the process of selecting that party's nominee for President of the United States, took place on February 5, one of the many nominating contests of 2008's "Super Tuesday". The primary election chose 38 pledged delegates to represent Oklahoma at the 2008 Democratic National Convention. The remainder of Oklahoma's 47 delegates consisted of unpledged superdelegates not bound by the results of the primary. The election was a closed primary, meaning that only registered Democrats could vote in this election. Hillary Clinton won the primary by a significant margin.

Clinton, Barack Obama, and Jim Rogers appeared on the ballot, together with four candidates who had already withdrawn from the contest: Chris Dodd, Bill Richardson,  Dennis Kucinich, and John Edwards. All but Rogers had run nationwide campaigns for the presidential nomination; Rogers is a perennial candidate in Oklahoma who had run for lieutenant governor in 2006.

Pre-primary polling, predictions, and events

Early polling in Oklahoma consistently showed Clinton and Edwards to be the leaders in the state, and Obama a more distant third. The polling also indicated that other candidates were barely registering. In 2004 Edwards narrowly finished second in Oklahoma behind Wesley Clark by about one thousand votes. Oklahoma had been a key state for John Edwards as he made stops in the state January 15 and 18, over three weeks ahead of the primary date, but Edwards withdrew on January 30, 2008. Former President Bill Clinton stopped at the University of Oklahoma on January 30 to speak at a rally supporting his wife.

Money raised from Oklahoma

Obtained from The Oklahoman

Delegates

Oklahoma sent 47 delegates to the Democratic National Convention.  In order to secure pledged delegates, a candidate had to receive at least 15% of the vote.  The delegates were broken down into the following categories:

 38 pledged delegates, allocated based on the results of the primary:
 25 District Level Delegates were allotted proportionally based on the support each candidate received in each congressional district. There were 5 delegates for each congressional district.
 8 At-large Delegates were allotted proportionally based on the support each candidate received statewide.
 5 party leaders and elected officials ("PLEO Delegates") were allotted proportionally based on the support each candidate received statewide.
 9 unpledged superdelegates consisting of PLEOs were not bound by the results of the primary.

Results

See also
 2008 Democratic Party presidential primaries
 2008 Oklahoma Republican presidential primary

References

External links
 Sample Ballot

Oklahoma
Democratic presidential primary
2008
2008 Super Tuesday